Nunavut is the least populous of Canada's three territories with 36,858 residents as of 2021, but the largest territory in land area, at . Nunavut is also larger than any of Canada's ten provinces. The remaining 99.8% of Nunavut's land mass comprises three small unincorporated settlements and three vast unorganized areas. The remaining  of the population, 18 residents, live in the unincorporated area of Unorganized Baffin.

Municipalities are created by the Government of Nunavut in accordance with the Cities, Towns and Villages Act (CTVA) and the Hamlets Act.  According to the CTVA, a municipality is an "area within the boundaries of a municipal corporation, as described in the order establishing or continuing the municipal corporation" where a municipal corporation is either a city, town or village. According to the Hamlets Act, a municipality is similarly an "area within the boundaries of a hamlet, as described in the order establishing or continuing the hamlet". All of Nunavut's 25 municipalities are hamlets except for the City of Iqaluit, which is the territory's capital.

The smallest municipality by population is Grise Fiord with 144 residents.

Cities 
An application can be submitted to incorporate a community as a city under the CTVA at the request of a minimum 25 residents that are eligible electors, or at the initiative of the Minister of Municipal and Community Affairs. The proposed city must have a minimum assessed land value of $200 million or an exception made by the Minister. It incorporated as a city on April 19, 2001.

Towns 
Although Nunavut has no municipalities with town status, the CTVA  provides opportunity to incorporate a town. A town can be incorporated at the request of a minimum 25 residents that are eligible electors, or at the initiative of the Minister of Municipal and Community Affairs. The proposed town must have a minimum assessed land value of $50 million or an exception made by the Minister. Iqaluit held town status between 1980 and 2001.

Villages 
Nunavut has no villages, but like town status the CTVA provides opportunity to incorporate a village. A village can be incorporated at the request of a minimum 25 residents that are eligible electors, or at the initiative of the Minister of Municipal and Community Affairs. The proposed village must have a minimum assessed land value of $10 million or an exception made by the Minister. Iqaluit held village status between 1974 and 1980.

Hamlets 
At the request of a minimum 25 residents that are eligible electors, or at the initiative of the Minister of Municipal and Community Affairs, an application can be submitted to incorporate a community as a hamlet under the Hamlets Act. Unlike cities, towns and villages, the incorporation of hamlets is not conditioned by a prescribed minimum assessed land value.

Nunavut has 24 hamlets. The largest hamlet by population is Rankin Inlet, with 2,975 residents, and the smallest is Grise Fiord, with 144 residents.

List of municipalities

See also 

List of population centres in the Canadian Territories

Notes

References

External links 
Government of Nunavut: Community and Government Services

Nunavut

Municipalities